2012 ICC Africa Twenty20 Division Two was a Twenty20 cricket tournament that took place in 2012 and formed part of qualifying for the 2014 ICC World Twenty20. South Africa hosted the event, with Botswana winning it.

Teams
Teams that qualified are as follows:-
 
 
 
 
 
 
  (promoted)
  (promoted)

Squads

Fixtures

Group stage

Points table

Matches

Statistics

Most runs
The top five run scorers (total runs) are included in this table.

Most wickets
The top five wicket takers (total wickets) are listed in this table.

See also
 2014 ICC World Twenty20 Qualifier
 World Cricket League

External links
Cricinfo Page

References

2014 ICC World Twenty20